Sybra quinquevittata is a species of beetle in the family Cerambycidae. It was described by Breuning in 1942. It is known from Borneo and Malaysia.

References

quinquevittata
Beetles described in 1942